Ahmad Kalassi (born 18 July 1990) is a Syrian footballer who plays for Al-Ittihad in the Syrian Premier League.

Club career
Ahmad began his professional career in 2008 with Al-Ittihad.

After spending a five-seasons spell with Al-Ittihad in Syria, he joined Al-Shorta in 2013 on loan. In 2014, he played in the Iraqi Premier League with Naft Maysan.

On 29 July 2014 he moved to Europe and joined Bosnian top-flight side FK Sarajevo. He signed a contract until 2017.

International career
From 2006 to 2008, he played for the Syria national under-17 football team and the Syria national under-20 football team. He was part of the squad that participated in the FIFA U-17 World Cup 2007 in South Korea. He played in one match in the tournament, in a 0-0 draw against Argentina. He was also member of the squad that participated in the 2008 AFC U-19 Championship.

He was part of the Syria national football team in the 2008 WAFF Championship.

International goals
Scores and results table. Syria's goal tally first:

|}

Career statistics

Honours

Club
Al-Ittihad
 Syrian Cup: 2011
 AFC Cup: 2010

FK Sarajevo
 Premier League of Bosnia and Herzegovina: 2014–15

National Team
 FIFA U-17 World Cup 2007: Round of 16

References

External links
 
 
 Player Info at Goalzz.com

1990 births
Sportspeople from Aleppo
Syrian footballers
Syria international footballers
Syrian expatriate footballers
Association football defenders
Expatriate footballers in Bosnia and Herzegovina
FK Sarajevo players
Living people
Expatriate footballers in Iraq
AFC Cup winning players
Syrian Premier League players